Mohammad Saleh Ahmed (born 2 February 1969 in Faridpur, Dacca (now Dhaka) is a first-class and List A cricketer from Bangladesh. He is a right-handed batsman and slow left-arm orthodox bowler. He is sometimes known by his nickname Sohel. He debuted in 2000 and last appeared in 2002.  He played for Barisal Division in 2001/02 after representing Biman Bangladesh Airlines in One-day cricket in 2000/01. His solitary first-class fifty, 53, came against Khulna Division while he took his best bowling, 4 for 54, against Chittagong Division.

External links
Cricket Archive profile

Bangladeshi cricketers
Barisal Division cricketers
Living people
1969 births
Biman Bangladesh Airlines cricketers
People from Faridpur District